Dmitry Aleksandrovich Podstrelov or Dzmitry Alyaksandravich Padstrelaw (born 6 September 1998) is a Belarusian professional footballer who plays for Caspiy.

International goal 
Scores and results list Belarus' goal tally first.

Honors
Shakhtyor Soligorsk
Belarusian Premier League champion: 2020, 2021
Belarusian Super Cup winner: 2021

References

External links 
 
 

1998 births
Living people
People from Mogilev
Sportspeople from Mogilev Region
Belarusian footballers
Association football forwards
Belarus international footballers
Belarusian expatriate footballers
Expatriate footballers in Kazakhstan
FC Dnepr Mogilev players
FC Dnyapro Mogilev players
FC Shakhtyor Soligorsk players
FC Caspiy players